Scott Shaw (born 23 September 1958 in Los Angeles, California) is an American author, martial artist, and filmmaker.

Career
Scott Shaw is an advanced martial artist.  He has written a number of books on the martial arts. Shaw has written a number of books on Zen Buddhism and eastern philosophy.

Shaw is an active actor and filmmaker.  
In collaboration with American filmmaker Donald G. Jackson he created a style of filmmaking where no screenplay and scripts are used in the creation of a movie. He titled this style of filmmaking, "Zen Filmmaking."

Works

Partial bibliography
About Peace 
Advanced Taekwondo 
Alles op Zen tijd
Arc Left from Istanbul: A Photographic Exploration
Bangkok and the Nights of Drunken Stupor 
Bangkok: Beyond the Buddha
Bus Rides
Cairo Before the Aftermath: A Photographic Exploration
Cambodian Refugees in Long Beach, California: The Definitive Study 
Čchi-kung pro začátečníky
Chi Kung for Beginners: Master the Flow of Chi for Good Health, Stress Reductions & Increased Energy 
E.Q. 
El Ki o la energia dinamica
El pequeño libro de la respiración: El Pranayama, de manera fácil
[[Gods In Polyester (film book)|Gods in Polyester: A Survivors' Account Of 70's Cinema Obscura]]  (Contributor)Hapkido Articles on Self-DefenseHapkido Articles on Self-Defense: Volume TwoHapkido: Essays on Self-Defense Hapkido: Korean Art of Self-Defense Hong Kong Out of FocusIl Feluire Del KiIn the Foreboding Shadows of Holiness (Independent Filmmaking: Secrets of the CraftIsrael in the ObliqueJunk: The Back Streets of Bangkok Ki: Technici Eneggentice CoreeneL. A. Tales from the Suburban Side of Hell La Vita Secondo Lo ZenLast Will & Testament According to the Divine Rites of the Drug Cocaine Lo zen e la vitaLos Angeles Koreatown: An Urban Geographical View of the Factors That Lead to Its Inception & Its Current Urbanization Love Lived Too Long Marguerite Duras And Charles Bukowski: The Yin And Yang Of Modern Erotic Literature Mastering Health: The A to Z of Chi KungNirvána dióhéjban - 157 zen-meditációNirvana in a Nutshell: 157 Zen Meditations No Kisses for the Sinner On the Hard Edge of HollywoodOne Word MeditationsPagan, Burma: Shadows of the StupaPránajáma dióhéjbanPranayama: A Respiracao Para Revitalizacao EnergeticaRangoon and Mandalay: A Photographic ExplorationSake in a Glass, Sushi with Your Fingers: Fifteen Minutes in Tokyo Samurai Zen Sanskrit, the Language: Inception and Modern Day Ramifications Scream of the BuddhaScream: Southeast Asia & the Dream Scribbles on the Restroom WallSedona Realm of the VortexShama BabaShanghai Whispers Shanghai Screams Shattered ThoughtsSiam Tracy Simple Bliss: Nirvana Made Easy Singapore Off CenterSkid Row 1983: A Photographic ExplorationSouth Korea in a BlurSuicide Slowly Szamurai ZenTaekwondo - Căn bảnTaekwondo Basics The Abstract Arsenal of Zen and the Psychology of Being: Further Zen Ramblings from the InternetThe Chronicles: Zen Ramblings from the InternetThe History of the HmongThe Ki Process: Korean Secrets for Cultivating Dynamic Energy The Little Book of Yoga Breathing: Pranayama Made Easy The Little Book of Yoga MeditationThe Most Beautiful Woman in Shanghai The Passionate Kiss of Illusion The Roller Blade Seven: A Photographic ExplorationThe Screenplays The Tao of Self-Defense The Voodoo BuddhaThe Warrior Is Silent: Martial Art and the Spiritual Path The Zen of Everything The Zen of Life, Lies, and Aberrant RealityThere Is No Wind Through the Trees on a Treeless Beach TKO: Lost Nights in Tokyo Varanasi and Bodh Gaya: Shade of the Bodhi Tree: A Photographic ExplorationWar Wet Dreams and Placid Silence Wo' Ton of the Blue Vision Yoga the Inner Journey Zen and Modern ConsciousnessZen Buddhism: The Pathway to Nirvana Zen Filmmaking Zen Filmmaking 2: Further Writings on the Cinematic ArtsZen in the Blink of an Eye Zen Mind Life ThoughtsZen O'Clock: Time to Be Zen-kapu a belső békességhez
 Zen: Tales from the Journey ZenÓra Mesterek és harci művészetek
Zero One 

Partial filmography
9mm Sunrise (2006) (also Producer/Director)
Guns of El Chupacabra (1997) (also Producer)
Hitman City (2003) (also Producer/Director)
Interview: The Documentary (2005) (Producer/Director)
Killer: Dead or Alive (2006) (also Producer/Director)
Max Hell Frog Warrior (1996) (also Producer/Director) (a.k.a. Hell Comes to Frogtown III, Toad Warrior and Max Hell Comes to Frogtown)
One Shot Sam (2006) (Director)
Return of the Roller Blade Seven (1993) (also Producer)
Samurai Johnny Frankenstein (1993) (also Producer/Director)
Samurai Vampire Bikers From Hell (1992) (also Producer/Director); martial art based vampire film directed by and starring Shaw. released with the alternative titles, "Alexander Hell" and "Hellzone Rangers."
Super Hero Central (2004) (also Producer/Director)
The Final Kiss (2005) (also Producer/Director)
The Legend of the Roller Blade Seven (1992) (also Producer)
The Rock n' Roll Cops (2003) (also Producer/Director)
The Roller Blade Seven (1991) (also Producer)
Undercover X (2001) (also Producer/Director)
Vampire Blvd. (2004) (also Producer/Director)
Vampire Noir (2007) (also Producer/Director)

References

External links

 
 

1958 births
Living people
American experimental filmmakers
20th-century American novelists
21st-century American novelists
Male actors from Los Angeles
American Buddhists
American Zen Buddhists
Zen Buddhism writers
American male film actors
American film producers
American hapkido practitioners
American martial arts writers
American male novelists
American spiritual writers
American male taekwondo practitioners
California State University, Northridge alumni
California State University, Los Angeles alumni
California State University, Dominguez Hills alumni
Alumni of the University of Oxford
Converts to Buddhism
Musicians from Los Angeles
New Age writers
Shanghai University
Writers from Los Angeles
20th-century American poets
21st-century American poets
American male poets
Film directors from Los Angeles
21st-century American non-fiction writers
American male non-fiction writers
Sportswriters from California
20th-century American male writers
21st-century American male writers